When Ladies Meet (television broadcast title: Strange Skirts) is a 1941 American romantic comedy film by Metro-Goldwyn-Mayer starring Joan Crawford, Robert Taylor, Greer Garson, Herbert Marshall, and Spring Byington in a story about a novelist in love with her publisher. The screenplay by S.K. Lauren and Anita Loos was based upon a 1932 play by Rachel Crothers. The film was directed by Robert Z. Leonard, who also co-produced the film (with Orville O. Dull). The film was a remake of the 1933 pre-Code film of the same name, which starred Ann Harding, Myrna Loy, Robert Montgomery, and Frank Morgan in the roles played by Garson, Crawford, Taylor and Marshall.

Cast
 Joan Crawford as Mary 'Minnie' Howard
 Robert Taylor as Jimmy Lee
 Greer Garson as Mrs. Clare Woodruf
 Herbert Marshall as Rogers Woodruf
 Spring Byington as Bridget 'Bridgie' Drake
 Rafael Storm as Walter Del Canto
 Mona Barrie as Mabel Guiness
 Max Willenz as Pierre, Bridget's Summer House Handyman
 Florence Shirley as Janet Hopper
 Leslie Francis as Homer Hopper

Reception
Howard Barnes of the New York Herald Tribune wrote, "Even when [Crawford] is wearing spectacles, she is not particularly convincing in the part."

Box office
According to MGM records the film earned $1,162,000 in the US and Canada and $684,000 elsewhere resulting in a profit of $607,000.

Awards and nominations
The film earned an Academy Award nomination for art directors Cedric Gibbons, Randall Duell and Edwin B. Willis.

Home media
When Ladies Meet was released on Region 1 DVD on March 23, 2009 from the online Warner Bros. Archive Collection.

References

External links
 
 
 
 

1941 films
American romantic comedy films
1941 romantic comedy films
American black-and-white films
Films directed by Robert Z. Leonard
Films scored by Bronisław Kaper
Metro-Goldwyn-Mayer films
American films based on plays
Films with screenplays by Anita Loos
1940s English-language films
1940s American films